Daniel Bateman Cutter (May 10, 1808 – December 7, 1889) was an American physician.

Cutter, the eldest child of Daniel and Sally (Jones) Cutter, was born in Jaffrey, New Hampshire, on May 10, 1808. He graduated from Dartmouth College in 1833, and had studied medicine under Luke Howe, M.D., of Jaffrey, and under his uncle, Nehemiah Cutter, M.D., of Pepperell, Massachusetts, before coming to New Haven. He graduated from the Yale School of Medicine in 1835.

He practiced his profession in Ashby, Massachusetts, until 1837, and for the rest of his life in Peterborough, New Hampshire. He was a member of the New Hampshire State Legislature in 1852. In 1881 he published a history of his native place.

He died in Peterborough, of old age and disease of the kidneys, on December 7, 1889, in his 82nd year.

He married, on December 8, 1835, Clementina, daughter of the Hon. Asa Parker, of Jaffrey, who died on August 28, 1870; two daughters by this marriage died before their father. He next married, on December 5, 1872, Tryphena (Tufts) Richardson, who survived him.

External links
 
 History of the town of Jaffrey, New Hampshire, from the date of the Masonian charter to the present time, 1749-1880

1808 births
1889 deaths
People from Jaffrey, New Hampshire
Dartmouth College alumni
Yale School of Medicine alumni
Physicians from New Hampshire
Members of the New Hampshire General Court
19th-century American politicians
People from Peterborough, New Hampshire